The General Inspection Organization of Iran (GIO) is linked to the Judiciary of Iran. It is also called the State Inspectorate Organization of Iran. The organization is a member of Asian Ombudsman Association and International Ombudsman Institute. Also, it is the member of International Association of Anti Corruption Authorities. However, it is not the primary anti-corruption body and there are several agencies including Supreme Audit Court, Ministry of Justice and Parliamentary Commission for enforcing principle 90 of the constitution, which are involved in fighting corruption and enforcing United Nations Convention Against Corruption.

Based upon Iran's Constitution, GIO is in-charge for regular controlling and supervising executive bodies, military and disciplinary forces, state-run institutions and companies, municipalities and their subsidiaries, public notary chambers, foundations of public utility, revolutionary organs, and institutions whose financial resources totally or partially belong to the government.

See also
Economy of Iran
Supreme Audit Court of Iran
Imperial Inspectorate Organization, a similar pre-revolutionary body
Islamic Revolutionary Court
Iranian Economic Reform Plan
Ministry of Intelligence and National Security of Iran
History of the Islamic Republic of Iran

References

External links
General Inspection Office 
Ombudsman posts
Government of Iran
Economy of Iran